Notobatrachus is an extinct genus of frog from the Lower Jurassic (Toarcian) Cañadon Asfalto Formation, Cañadón Asfalto Basin and Middle Jurassic La Matilde Formation, Deseado Massif of Patagonia, Argentina. N. degiustoi is the most completely known Jurassic frog and has been recorded in many outcrops of the La Matilde Formation of the Deseado Massif in southern Patagonia.

Description 
CPBA-V-14003 consists of disarticulated cranial and postcranial elements, and  may correspond either to a late metamorphosing tadpole or an early postmetamorphic individual.

References

Bibliography

Further reading 
 Wildlife of Gondwana: Dinosaurs and Other Vertebrates from the Ancient Supercontinent (Life of the Past) by Pat Vickers Rich, Thomas Hewitt Rich, Francesco Coffa, and Steven Morton  
 The Age of Dinosaurs in Russia and Mongolia by Michael J. Benton, Mikhail A. Shishkin, David M. Unwin, and Evgenii N. Kurochkin 
 Fossil Frogs and Toads of North America (Life of the Past) by J. Alan Holman

Archaeobatrachia
Amphibian genera
Prehistoric frogs
Early Jurassic first appearances
Middle Jurassic extinctions
†Notobatrachus
Mesozoic frogs
Middle Jurassic amphibians
Jurassic amphibians of South America
Middle Jurassic tetrapods of South America
Jurassic Argentina
Fossils of Argentina
Cañadón Asfalto Formation
Fossil taxa described in 1956